Hisarlı can refer to:

 Hisarlı, Ardanuç
 Hisarlı, Biga
 Hisarlı, Enez